Psychrobacter urativorans is a Gram-negative, aerobic, nonmotile bacterium of the genus  Psychrobacter, which was isolated  a finished package of pork sausage from frozen meat.

References

External links
Type strain of Psychrobacter urativorans at BacDive -  the Bacterial Diversity Metadatabase
 	

Moraxellaceae
Bacteria described in 1996